The Louisiana Scenic Byways are a network of roadways within the U.S. state of Louisiana that have been deemed of cultural, historical, or scenic value.  The routes follow various segments of the state-maintained highway system, usually rural in character, and are mostly located in the central and southern areas of the state.

List
There are currently 18 routes that are active members of the Louisiana Scenic Byways program, following its reorganization in 2010.

Creole Nature Trail

The Creole Nature Trail is an All-American Road that is designated primarily along stretches of LA 27 and LA 82 in Cameron and Calcasieu parishes, located in the southwestern corner of the state.  Like most of Louisiana's Scenic Byways, it does not follow a linear route but instead consists of a network of existing state-maintained highways.  The trail spans a total of  through a remote area sometimes referred to as "Louisiana's Outback."  The surroundings range from marshland and prairie to sandy beaches and contain a wide variety of wildlife, including alligators, birds, butterflies, and fish.  Four wildlife refuges are located along the route.

References

External links
Louisiana Byways

Scenic highways in Louisiana
list
Louisiana Scenic Byways